Antonio Cimatori, called Il Visacci (c. 1550–1623)  was an Italian painter.

Life
Cimatori was a native of Urbino, who excelled in chiaroscuro and in pen and ink drawing, painting mainly religious scenes. He was a scholar of Federico Barocci. Among his pupils was Giulio Cesare Begni.

His paintings of the Annunciation and of St Francesca da Rimini are in the church of S. Biagio in Roncofreddo. He painted an Adoration of the Magi and a Crucifixion for the church of San Giovanni Battista, Rimini.

Works
St. Matthew and the Angel
Works at the Louvre (in the graphic arts department), Paris:
Annunciation
Martyrdom of St Sebastian

References

Sources
 

Year of birth unknown
1623 deaths
People from Urbino
16th-century Italian painters
Italian male painters
17th-century Italian painters
Year of birth uncertain